Te Whanganui-A-Hei (Cathedral Cove) Marine Reserve is in the southern part of Mercury Bay on the Coromandel Peninsula in New Zealand covering an area of . On the coast of the mainland, it stretches from Cook Bluff in the north-west to the northern end of Hahei Beach in the south-east. Its offshore extremes run from Motukorure Island through Waikaranga Island to Okorotere Island and the northern end of Mahurangi Island (Goat Island).

Part of the marine reserve lies off the Cathedral Cove Recreation Reserve, which runs from the northern end of Hahei Beach in the south-east to beyond Cathedral Cove in the north-west. With attractions such as a natural rock archway and neighbouring beaches at Cathedral Cove, the area is very popular with tourists, and receives around 150,000 visitors per year.

Etymology 
The Māori name for Mercury Bay, Te Whanganui-A-Hei (meaning the Great Bay of Hei), refers to Hei, a tohunga from the Te Arawa waka. According to tradition, Hei chose the area around Mercury Bay as home for his tribe, proclaiming ownership by calling Motueka Island "Te Kuraetanga-o-taku-Ihu" (the outward curve of my nose). It is said he made this claim near the present-day town of Hahei.

Pop Culture 
The cave and beach were used as the tunnel through which the Pevensie children first re-enter Narnia in the movie version of The Chronicles of Narnia: Prince Caspian. More recently the cove was used as one of the locations in the music video for the song "Can't Hold Us" by Macklemore and Ryan Lewis featuring Ray Dalton.

See also
Marine reserves of New Zealand

References

External links
Whanganui A Hei (Cathedral Cove) Marine Reserve, Department of Conservation

Marine reserves of New Zealand
Natural arches
Protected areas established in 1992
Protected areas of Waikato
Rock formations of Waikato
Thames-Coromandel District